Walter Stewart may refer to:

Politics
 Walter Stewart, 5th Earl of Menteith (1230s–1290s), also called Walter Bailloch or Walter Balloch
 Walter Stewart, 3rd High Steward of Scotland (died 1246)
 Walter Stewart, 6th High Steward of Scotland (1296–1327)
 Walter Stewart, Lord of Fife (1338–1362)
 Walter Stewart, Earl of Atholl (died 1437), Scottish nobleman
 Walter Stewart, 3rd Laird of Baldorran (1480–1575), Scottish landowner
 Walter Stewart, 1st Lord Blantyre (died 1617), Scottish nobleman
 Walter Stewart (MP), Scottish courtier and politician in the House of Commons, 1624–25
 W. F. Alan Stewart (1885–1956), farmer and political figure in Prince Edward Island
 Walter Stewart, Solicitor General for Scotland 1720–21

Other
 Walter Stewart (general) (1756–1796), Pennsylvania officer during the American Revolutionary War
 Walter Stewart (footballer) (1875–1926), Australian footballer in Victorian Football League (VFL)
 Walter W. Stewart (1885–1958), American economist
 Walter Stewart (journalist) (1931–2004), Canadian writer and educator
 Walter Stewart (priest), Archdeacon of St Andrews and Bishop-elect of Dunblane
 Alfred Walter Stewart (1880–1947), British chemist and part-time novelist
 Walter Stewart (american football coach) (2013 - Present), Current DL Coach for Cincinnati Bearcats